Compass Island is a small rocky island  high, lying in Marguerite Bay  northwest of the Terra Firma Islands. It was first seen and photographed from the air on 1 February 1937 by the British Graham Land Expedition. It was first visited by the Falkland Islands Dependencies Survey in 1948, surveyed by them in 1949, and so named by them because of difficulties experienced here with compass bearings, eventually proved to be due to substitution of iron for copper wire in an anorak hood.

See also 
 List of Antarctic and sub-Antarctic islands

References 

Islands of Graham Land
Fallières Coast